Neeli is a 2018 Indian Malayalam-language horror film written and directed by Althaf Rahman. The film stars Anoop Menon, Mamta Mohandas and Baby Mya. It was produced by T. A. Sundar Menon under the banner of Sun Ads And Film Productions.

Plot

The film's protagonist Lekshmi (Mamta) is a speech therapist and a single mother. She along with her daughter returns to their ancestral village in Kalingadu, after her husband (Rahul Madhav) passes away. During one night, Lakshmi is attacked and her daughter kidnapped. The rest for the tale is the pursuit of the daughter. After obvious efforts to track down her daughter fail, Lekshmi seeks the help of an supernatural power in the village, Neeli. 
A paranormal investigator Reny (Anoop Menon) enters the fray along with two good-hearted thieves played by Baburaj and Sreekumar along with a photographer essayed by Zinil Zainudeen - the trio take care of the comedic devices in the film. Not that it needed many, especially with Reny's gizmos that could track any energy based on its smell.

Cast

 Anoop Menon as Reni
 Mamta Mohandas as Lakshmi
 Babu Raj as Prabhakaran
Baby Miya as Thara
S. P. Sreekumar as Jalal
Zinil Zainuddin
Rahul Madhav as Alex Mathew
Anjana Menon as spiritual lady
Swasika in a dance performance
Megha Mathew as Zareena
Dhruv as Chemmadan Raghavan
Kukku
Nityasri 
Balaji
Megha Nair

Release
Neeli was released in India on 11 August 2018.

References

External links
 

2010s Malayalam-language films